Keith Urban is the debut studio album by New Zealand-born country music singer Keith Urban. It was released only in Australia in 1991. It was later released worldwide in 2005 by EMI. This album included three singles, "I Never Work on a Sunday", "Only You" and "Got It Bad", released between 1990 and 1991 respectively.  "Only You" was made into a music video in 1991. Urban later recorded the instrumental track "Clutterbilly" as a member of the band The Ranch in 1997. The album charted at number 98 in Australia.

Track listing

Chart performance

References

1991 debut albums
Keith Urban albums
EMI Records albums